Gregory Logan (born 25 June 1963) is a New Zealand former cricketer. He played in 22 first-class and 21 List A matches for Central Districts from 1986 to 1990.

See also
 List of Central Districts representative cricketers

References

External links
 

1963 births
Living people
New Zealand cricketers
Central Districts cricketers
People from Waikari
Cricketers from Canterbury, New Zealand